Byron David Castillo Segura (born 10 November 1998) is an Ecuadorian footballer who plays for Liga MX club León and the Ecuador national team. Mainly a right-back, he can also play as a winger.

Club career

Early career
Castillo began his career with Norte América, but made his debut as a senior while on loan at Deportivo Azogues. In May 2015, he was loaned to Emelec, but was released in July after having problems with his documentation.

In January 2016, Castillo moved to Aucas. He made his Serie A debut with the side on 7 February, starting in a 1–2 away loss against Fuerza Amarilla, and scored his first goal in the category late in the month, in a 1–1 home draw against Mushuc Runa. On 31 December, Aucas announced that he had extended his contract with the club for a further four seasons.

Barcelona SC
On 5 January 2017, Castillo was presented at Barcelona SC. After featuring in just one match during his first season, he started to feature more regularly from the 2018 season onwards, and became a regular starter in 2020.

On 10 July 2021, Castillo signed a new contract with the club until 2025.

León
On 10 June 2022, Castillo signed for Liga MX side León.

International career

Youth
Castillo was a part of the Ecuador under-17 team that featured in both the 2015 South American U-17 Championship and the 2015 FIFA U-17 World Cup, being an undisputed starter for the side in both tournaments. In November 2016, he featured for the under-20s in a friendly against Chile.

Senior
On 29 August 2021, Castillo was called up to the Ecuador national team by manager Gustavo Alfaro for three 2022 FIFA World Cup qualifiers against Paraguay, Chile and Uruguay. He made his full international debut on 2 September, starting in the 2–0 win over the former at the Estadio Rodrigo Paz Delgado in Quito.

Nationality issues
In 2017, Castillo was separated from the Ecuador under-20 squad after allegations that he was born in Tumaco, a Colombian city near the Ecuadorian border. He was accused of adulterating his birth documentation in January 2019 and this issue kept him out of any Ecuador national team until 2021.

In February 2021, an investigation started to determine if Castillo was Ecuadorian or Colombian. Finally, on 24 April of that year, his Ecuadorian nationality was confirmed. In May 2022, the Chilean Football Federation submitted a complaint to FIFA about Castillo's nationality, alleging that he was born in Tumaco, Colombia in July 1995. FIFA closed the investigation after nearly one month on 10 June, confirming Ecuador's spot in the World Cup.

Spanish sporting newspaper Marca published audio that was apparently of Castillo admitting his illegitimate entry into Ecuador, as well as his birthplace in Colombia, and his correct year of birth. The recording is said to be from an interview between Castillo and the Ecuadorian football association, but was kept quiet by the federation. The paper also published both Colombian and Ecuadorian birth certificates for Castillo, illustrating discrepancies in his name, birthplace, and date of birth. FIFA's Appeals Commission has reopened the investigation and began the hearing on 15 September before making the final decision in early October, which, if proven, could lead to Ecuador being disqualified from the 2022 FIFA World Cup. The next day, FIFA ruled in favor of Castillo again.

On 8 November 2022, the Court of Arbitration for Sport ruled that Castillo was indeed born in Tumaco on 25 June 1995, but since the nationality of a player is defined by national law and Ecuador recognizes Castillo as an Ecuadorian national, he has been eligible to play for the Ecuador national team. The FEF were however, fined CHF 100,000 and handed a 3-point deduction in the 2026 World Cup qualifiers for CONMEBOL due to the use of a document which contained false information.

Career statistics

Club

International

Honours
Barcelona SC
Ecuadorian Serie A: 2020

References

1998 births
Living people
People from Guayas Province
Ecuadorian footballers
Association football defenders
Association football wingers
Ecuadorian Serie A players
Ecuadorian Serie B players
C.S. Norte América footballers
Deportivo Azogues footballers
C.S. Emelec footballers
S.D. Aucas footballers
Barcelona S.C. footballers
Liga MX players
Club León footballers
Ecuador international footballers
Ecuadorian expatriate footballers
Ecuadorian expatriate sportspeople in Mexico
Expatriate footballers in Mexico
Association football controversies
Age controversies
Nationality controversies